Alan Richard Knill (born 8 October 1964) is a professional football manager and former player, who is a coach for the Wales national team. He played as a centre-back for several clubs, spending the most time at Halifax Town, Bury and Scunthorpe United. Born in England, he made one appearance for Wales in 1988.

He has also managed his former clubs Rotherham United, Bury, Scunthorpe United and had a short-lived spell at Torquay United.

Playing career
Knill was born in Slough and started his career as a trainee with Southampton in November 1978. He signed as a professional in October 1982, but failed to break into the first–team. He then moved on to Halifax Town (1984–87), Swansea City (1987–89), Bury (1989–93), Cardiff City (1993, on loan), Scunthorpe United (1993–97) and Rotherham United (1997–99).

He also played once for Wales, in a World Cup qualifier against the Netherlands in Amsterdam in September 1988.

Managerial career
Knill was appointed manager of Rotherham United in February 2006, when predecessor Mick Harford was sacked. On 1 March 2007, Knill was sacked as manager of Rotherham, leaving the club bottom of League One and without a win in his final 14 games.

On 17 March 2007, he was appointed to Chesterfield's backroom staff to help newly appointed caretaker manager Lee Richardson try save the Spireites from relegation from League One, but the club were eventually relegated.

On 4 February 2008, he was appointed manager of League Two side Bury. In his first full season in charge, Knill led the Shakers to 4th place in League Two, missing out on automatic promotion by one goal on goal difference. They were then beaten on penalties in a play-off semi final against Shrewsbury Town.

With eight games remaining, and only one point from the play-offs, Alan Knill left Bury to join Scunthorpe United on 31 March 2011. His first game in charge was a 6–0 defeat at the hands of Norwich City, followed by a 4–1 victory over table-topping Queens Park Rangers.

After a difficult start to the 2012 season, Knill believed that life had been put into perspective after narrowly avoiding serious injury after a crash with a squirrel.

Knill was sacked as Scunthorpe manager on 29 October 2012 and replaced by Brian Laws.

On 20 February 2013, Torquay United appointed Knill as caretaker manager in place of Martin Ling, who had gone on sick leave. Knill's objective was to keep The Gulls in the football league and that was achieved on the final day of the season with a 3–3 draw at home to Bristol Rovers. Knill saw his efforts with Torquay as a success, and felt he had "improved his CV" by helping the club avoid relegation. On 7 May 2013, he was appointed the permanent manager of Torquay. Knill was sacked on 2 January 2014 with the club having won only five league games in the 2013–14 season and sitting 23rd in League Two.

On 27 January 2014, Knill was made assistant to the new Northampton Town manager Chris Wilder, who had been Knill's assistant at Bury. He then followed Wilder to become his assistant manager at Sheffield United in May 2016. On 7 November 2021, he linked up with Wilder for a third time, becoming the assistant manager at Championship side Middlesbrough.

In August 2021, he joined the backroom staff of the Wales national team under manager Rob Page.

Managerial statistics

.

Honours
Individual
League One Manager of the Month: October 2006
League Two Manager of the Month: September 2008, January 2009, October 2010

References

External links

1964 births
Living people
Sportspeople from Slough
English footballers
Welsh footballers
Wales international footballers
English Football League players
Southampton F.C. players
Halifax Town A.F.C. players
Swansea City A.F.C. players
Bury F.C. players
Cardiff City F.C. players
Scunthorpe United F.C. players
Rotherham United F.C. players
English football managers
Rotherham United F.C. managers
Bury F.C. managers
Scunthorpe United F.C. managers
English Football League managers
Association football defenders
Northampton Town F.C. non-playing staff
Sheffield United F.C. non-playing staff
Footballers from Berkshire
Middlesbrough F.C. non-playing staff